Kadenang Bulaklak is a 1994 Philippine drama film directed by Joel Lamangan. The film stars Vina Morales, Ana Roces, Donna Cruz and Angelu de Leon.

Cast
 Gloria Romero as Mrs. Doctolero
 Charito Solis as Ms. Conchita Carbonell
 Nida Blanca as Elsa Abolencia
 Boots Anson-Roa as Mrs. Hidalgo
 Luis Gonzales as Domeng Abolencia
 Vina Morales as Jasmin Abolencia
 Ana Roces as Baby Abolencia
 Donna Cruz as Violy Abolencia
 Angelu de Leon as Daisy Abolencia
 Gary Estrada as Lando Baquiran
 Rustom Padilla as Nestor Rocha
 Dale Villar as Robert de Vera
 Raffy Rodriguez as Manuel Rosano
 Giselle Sanchez as Nenita Dela Cruz
 Pinky Amador as Tere
 Mandy Ochoa as Merto
 Pete Roa as Mr. Hidalgo
 Tony Mabesa as Mr. Benigno Doctolero
 Rolando Tinio as Father Barrientos
 Jeffrey Hidalgo as Jerry
 Jessa Zaragoza as Sarah Quintos
 Jim Pebanco as Ruben Paez
 Tyrone Sason as Norman
 Cesar Burbos as Joey Sanchez
 Ces Mathay as Mr. Hernando
 Frank Rivera as Manager of Agency
 Ester Chavez as Sister Ester
 Lora Luna as Luz Paez
 Alma Lerma as Landlady
 Inday Badiday as herself
 Don Pepot as Pepot
 Marie Barbacui as Maria

Awards

References

External links

1994 films
Filipino-language films
Philippine drama films
Viva Films films
Films directed by Joel Lamangan